Przeździecki (feminine Przeździecka) is a Polish surname. Notable people include:

 Aleksander Narcyz Przezdziecki (1814-1871), Polish historian
 Andrzej Przeździecki (1926-2011), Polish fencer
 Henryk Przeździecki (1909-1977), Polish footballer and ice hockey player
 Marta Przeździecka (born 1988), Polish chess player
 Wacław Przeździecki (1883-1964), Polish military officer

Polish-language surnames